The Chicago Illinois Temple is the thirty-fifth temple of the Church of Jesus Christ of Latter-day Saints.  It is the second of three church temples that have been built in Illinois (The first and the third being the Nauvoo Temple and the Nauvoo Illinois Temple).

History
Located in the Chicago suburb of Glenview, ground was broken on the site of Chicago Illinois Temple on August 13, 1983 by Gordon B. Hinckley, a member of the church's First Presidency.  The structure itself was constructed in gray buff marble and its roof features gray slate.  Architects used a revolutionary design for LDS temples, adapting the traditional six-spire design and adding modern motifs.

The construction of the temple faced some pushback from the community due to environmental concerns. Construction was eventually able to proceed. Construction of the temple also allowed local Latter-day Saints to contribute their means, talents, and time. This included children donating pennies, young women making dolls for the temple nursery, and women crocheting and tatting altar cloths. Many hours were donated in helping with the public open house, held July 15 – August 3, 1985, during which over one hundred thousand people toured the temple. Hinckley dedicated the temple on August 9, 1985.

Four years after the dedication, the temple was closed and expanded that more than doubled its size.

On December 24, 2008, a frozen sprinkler pipe burst in the ceiling, with water-damaged furniture, carpet and wood trim that all had to be replaced.

In 2020, like all the church's other temples, the Chicago Illinois Temple was closed in response to the coronavirus pandemic.

See also

 Comparison of temples of The Church of Jesus Christ of Latter-day Saints
 List of temples of The Church of Jesus Christ of Latter-day Saints
 List of temples of The Church of Jesus Christ of Latter-day Saints by geographic region
 Temple architecture (Latter-day Saints)
 The Church of Jesus Christ of Latter-day Saints in Illinois

References

External links
 
 Chicago Illinois Temple Official site
 Chicago Illinois Temple at ChurchofJesusChristTemples.org

20th-century Latter Day Saint temples
Latter Day Saint movement in Illinois
Religious buildings and structures in Chicago
Religious buildings and structures completed in 1985
Temples (LDS Church) in Illinois
1985 establishments in Illinois
Glenview, Illinois